Mominul Haque (born 29 September 1991), also known as Muminul Showrav, is a Bangladeshi cricketer who is a former captain of the Bangladesh national team in Test matches. He is a left-handed batter.

Domestic career
Mominul made his first-class cricket debut during the 2008–09 season, playing in a National Cricket League (NCL) match for Dhaka Division against Chittagong Division. He made his List A cricket debut for the side later in the season, but these were his only matches for Dhaka, and by the following season he was playing for Chittagong in the NCL.  he has continued to play for Chittagong in domestic cricket as well as playing for East Zone in the Bangladesh Cricket League tournament.

After making his Twenty20 cricket debut for a Bangladesh Cricket Board XI against the touring West Indians in 2011, Mominul was selected to play for Barisal Burners in the 2012 Bangladesh Premier League, the league's first season. He has since played in the competition for five of the eight franchises to have competed.

In 2013–14 he scored 129 runs, batting alongside Roshen Silva to set a new highest fourth wicket partnership in List A cricket, the pair scoring 276 runs playing for Prime Doleshwar Sporting Club against Abahani Limited in a Dhaka Premier Division match.  this remains the highest fourth wicket partnership in any List A cricket match.

International career
Mominul made both his One Day International (ODI) and Twenty20 (T20) debuts against the West Indies in a home series in November and December 2012 as a replacement for the injured Shakib Al Hasan. In four matches he scored 69 runs and took two wickets. He made his Test match debut in March 2013, playing against Sri Lanka at Galle. He scored a half-century on debut, and finished the tour with 156 runs in three innings at a batting average of 52.00 runs per innings in his maiden Test series.

He made his first century in a Test match against New Zealand at Chittagong in 2013, scored from exactly 100 balls. In the second Test of the series, Mominul scored another century, becoming only the second Bangladesh batsman after Tamim Iqbal to hit centuries in two consecutive Test matches. He scored another century at Chittagong during the season, this time against the touring Sri Lankans.

In November 2014 Mominul scored his fourth Test century, again at Chittagong, this time with Zimbabwe as the opponents. By May 2015 he had played 15 Test matches and became only the fifth batsman to score a half-century in at least one innings of a Test match in 11 consecutive matches.

After a half-century on the side's tour of New Zealand in early 2017, he struggled for form and was dropped from the squad ahead of Australia's tour of Bangladesh in August. Twenty-four hours later he was recalled for the first Test.

In January 2018, Mominul scored centuries in each innings of the first Test against Sri Lanka, scoring 176 and 105 not out. This was the first time a Bangladeshi batsman had scored hundreds in both innings of a Test match.

Test captaincy (2019–2022)
Mominul captained the Bangladesh A side in 2015. He was appointed as the 11th captain of Bangladesh's Test side in October 2019 when Shakib Al Hasan was banned from all forms of cricket for two years by the International Cricket Council after breaching the ICC's Anti-Corruption code. Mominul's first series as a Test captain was the two-match tour of India in November 2019. Bangladesh lost both matches by an innings inside three days.

His first victory as captain came in the February 2020 one-off Test against Zimbabwe, Bangladesh winning by an innings and 106 runs. Mominul scored 132 runs, his first century as captain, and equaled Tamim Iqbal's Bangladesh record of scoring nine Test centuries. The COVID-19 pandemic saw Bangladesh play no Test matches until February 2021 when a weakened West Indies side toured the country. Many of West Indies established players refused to tour for health security issues, but the side still defeated Bangladesh by three wickets in the first Test, chasing a total of 395, the fifth-highest successful run chase. In the second Test, chasing 248 Bangladesh fell short, losing both Test matches on the tour.

In April 2021, Bangladesh toured Sri Lanka for a two-match series. Mominul scored 127 in the first Test, his first Test century outside of Bangladesh. After securing a draw in the first Test, Bangladesh lost the second by 209 runs. A second victory as captain came, however, in July in a one-off Test in Zimbabwe, Bangladesh winning by 220 runs. In late 2021, Pakistan toured Bangladesh, Bangladesh losing both Test matches played on the tour, despite rain washing out most of day two and all of day three of the second Test.

Bangladesh toured New Zealand in January 2022 for another two-match series. In the first Test at Bay Oval, Bangladesh won by eight wickets, their first win in New Zealand in any format in 33 matches as well as their first Test match victory against a New Zealand side. New Zealand won the second Test inside three days to draw the series 1–1.

The first Test of Bangladesh's tour of South Africa in early 2022 was Mominul's 50th Test match, and he became the seventh Bangladeshi to play 50 or more Tests. The side lost heavily again. Mominul's final Test series as captain saw a draw and a loss against Sri Lanka in May 2022, after which Shakib al Hasan was reinstated as Bangladesh's Test captain after he returned from suspension and Mominul resigned as captain following a run of poor batting performances.

Records and achievements
Mominul is one of only six batsmen, and the only Bangladeshi, to score 11 or more consecutive scores of at least fifty in Test matches. He was the first Bangladeshi to score centuries in both innings of a Test match and the first Bangladeshi batsman to score 10 centuries in Test cricket.

International centuries
 Mominul has scored 11 centuries in Test matches, the most by any Bangladeshi batsman. He is yet to score a century in either One Day International or Twenty20 International cricket.

References

External links
 

Bangladeshi cricketers
Fortune Barishal cricketers
Dhaka Division cricketers
Bangladesh Test cricketers
Bangladesh One Day International cricketers
Bangladesh Twenty20 International cricketers
Living people
1991 births
Cricketers at the 2015 Cricket World Cup
Sylhet Strikers cricketers
Victoria Sporting Club cricketers
Mohammedan Sporting Club cricketers
Prime Doleshwar Sporting Club cricketers
Chittagong Division cricketers
Bangladesh East Zone cricketers
Bangladesh A cricketers
Rajshahi Royals cricketers
People from Cox's Bazar District